Cartersville is an unincorporated community in Florence County, in the U.S. state of South Carolina.

History
The community was named after the Carter family of early settlers. A post office called Cartersville was established in 1845, and remained in operation until 1953.

Local Businesses

Cartersville Country Winery - Local winery and part of the Harvest Host program.

References

Unincorporated communities in South Carolina
Unincorporated communities in Florence County, South Carolina